Jaakko Otto Sakari Minkkinen (born 28 July 1933) is a Finnish former sports shooter. He competed at the 1968, 1972 and the 1976 Summer Olympics.

References

External links
 

1933 births
Living people
Finnish male sport shooters
Olympic shooters of Finland
Shooters at the 1968 Summer Olympics
Shooters at the 1972 Summer Olympics
Shooters at the 1976 Summer Olympics
People from Äänekoski
Sportspeople from Central Finland